Antoine Joseph Michel Romagnesi (1 September 1781 – 9 January 1850) was a 19th-century French composer, music publisher and music theorist.

Life
Romagnesi was a pupil of Alexandre-Étienne Choron and Giuseppe Cambini. A soldier, then a clerk for the music publisher Auguste Le Duc in 1806, he became a publisher and music dealer himself in 1828, moving to 8 rue Richelieu in Paris.

He probably was a Freemason

Works
 Nadir et Sélim, three-act opéra comique, first performed at the Théâtre Feydeau in 1822.
 La Guirlande, one-act opéra, composed for the Académie Royale de Musique.

He also composed numerous duets, trios, nocturnes, contredanses and fantasies for piano and more than 200 romances including:
 Le Chien du régiment
 L'Heureuse Destinée (Le Duc, 1825)
 Le Présent et l'Avenir (Chansonnier des Grâces, 1839).

Publications
 Étrennes Musicales, yearly collection.
 Le Troubadour des Salons. Journal de chant avec Accompagnement de Lyre ou Guitare
 L'Abeille musicale. Journal de Chant, composé pour les jeunes personnes, par les auteurs les plus estimés en ce genre. Journal, published between 1828 and 1839.

References

1781 births
1850 deaths
19th-century classical composers
19th-century male musicians
French music publishers (people)
French opera composers
French Romantic composers
Male opera composers
Musicians from Paris